The Fall River Entrance Historic District in Rocky Mountain National Park preserves an area of park administration buildings and employee residences built in the National Park Service Rustic style. The area is close to Estes Park, Colorado, at the original primary entrance to the east side of the park.  The area includes the Bighorn Ranger Station, several houses, and some utility buildings. The buildings were designed in the 1920s and 1930s by the National Park Service Branch of Plans and Designs.  Many of the 1930s buildings were built by Civilian Conservation Corps labor.

The district was listed on the National Register of Historic Places in 1988, and enlarged in 2018.

See also
National Register of Historic Places listings in Larimer County, Colorado

See also
Fall River Road

References

Park buildings and structures on the National Register of Historic Places in Colorado
National Park Service rustic in Colorado
Buildings and structures in Larimer County, Colorado
National Register of Historic Places in Rocky Mountain National Park
Historic districts on the National Register of Historic Places in Colorado
National Register of Historic Places in Larimer County, Colorado